Alice De Wolf Kellogg (December 27, 1862 – February 4, 1900) was an American painter whose work was exhibited at the 1893 World's Columbian Exposition.

Early life
Alice De Wolf Kellogg was born in Chicago, Illinois, the fifth of six daughters born to physician John Leonard Kellogg and his wife Mary Gage Kellogg. Young Alice was afflicted with nephritis, the disease which would eventually kill her. Encouraged by her father John, a practitioner of holistic medicine, Alice sought relief from her headaches and depression by studying metaphysical ideas and practices including spiritualism, Swedenborgianism, and the writings of Mary Baker Eddy.

New Woman
As educational opportunities were made more available in the 19th century, women artists became part of professional enterprises, including founding their own art associations.  Artwork made by women was considered to be inferior, and to help overcome that stereotype women became "increasingly vocal and confident" in promoting women's work, and thus became part of the emerging image of the educated, modern and freer "New Woman". Artists then "played crucial roles in representing the New Woman, both by drawing images of the icon and exemplyfying this emerging type through their own lives."

Education and career
Kellogg studied at the Academy of Fine Arts, where she won the school's top prize, three months' tuition, and began teaching in 1887. In 1887 she traveled to Europe, where she spent time in England and studied at the Académie Julian, the Académie Colarossi, and the private atelier of American expatriate painter Charles Lasar in Paris. Her correspondence about her fellow American students' experience and work in Parisian art schools is a valuable record of life as an American artist in Europe, and the letters now reside at the Smithsonian Institution Archives of American Art. Kellogg exhibited paintings at the 1888 and 1889 Paris Salon exhibitions and at the Exposition Universelle of 1889.

Her most well-known work is The Mother, an 1889 painting which was exhibited in the Woman's Building at the 1893 World's Columbian Exposition. At that exposition she also exhibited paintings at the Palace of Fine Arts and the Illinois Building The painting was a modern variation on the Madonna theme, depicting a woman holding a sleeping baby on her lap. The Society of American Artists elected Kellogg to join their organization after The Mother was shown at their 1891 annual exhibition, and the painting was reproduced as the frontispiece of the January 1893 issue of Century Illustrated Monthly Magazine.

Her work is in the permanent collection of the Jane Addams Hull-House Museum. A pair of her paintings appeared on a 2014 edition of Antiques Roadshow; the two together were valued at $12,000.

Exhibitions
 New York Water Color Club, 1898
 Pennsylvania Academy of Fine Arts, Philadelphia, 1898
 AIC American Water Color Society, NYC
 Paris Salon de la Societe Nationale des Beaux-Arts, 1890
 Annual Exhibition, Bohemian Art Club, AIC, 1883
 Annual Exhibition, Palette Club, AIC, 1895
 World's Columbian Exposition, Chicago, 1893
 Society of American Artists, NYC

Notes

References
Annette Blaugrund with JoAnne W. Bowie, "Alice D. Kellogg: Letters from Paris, 1887-1889," Archives of American Art Journal 28, no. 3 (1988), pages 11–19.
Melissa Pierce Williams, Alice Kellogg Tyler, 1866-1900: Private Works, Columbia, Missouri: Williams & McCormick American Arts, 1986.

1862 births
1900 deaths
American women painters
19th-century American painters
Artists from Chicago
School of the Art Institute of Chicago alumni
School of the Art Institute of Chicago faculty
World's Columbian Exposition
19th-century American women artists
Académie Colarossi alumni
Painters from Illinois
American women academics